Curth Flatow (9 January 1920 – 4 June 2011) was a German dramatist and screenwriter who started his career in post-war Germany specializing in light comedy.  Flatow was born in Berlin. Many of his plays have been adapted for the big screen. One of his more recent shows is Ein gesegnetes Alter (A Blessed Age, 1996), a vehicle for Johannes Heesters.

Flatow's 2000 memoir is entitled Am Kurfürstendamm fing es an. Erinnerungen aus einem Gedächtnis mit Lücken. He died in 2011 in Berlin.

Plays 
1960 : Das Fenster zum Flur (with Horst Pillau). Premiered in Berlin at the Hebbel-Theater
1966 : Vater einer Tochter (based on the film ). Premiered in Berlin at the 
1968 : Das Geld liegt auf der Bank. Premiered in Berlin at the Hebbel-Theater
1973 : Der Mann, der sich nicht traut. Premiered in Berlin at the Komödie am Kurfürstendamm

Selected filmography
 King of Hearts (1947)
 When Men Cheat (1950)
 Dark Eyes (1951)
 The Chaste Libertine (1952)
 Dutch Girl (1953)
 The Bogeyman (1953)
 The Uncle from America (1953)
 The Telephone Operator (1954)
 How Do I Become a Film Star? (1955)
 Love, Dance and a Thousand Songs (1955)
 Kindermädchen für Papa gesucht (1957)
 The Simple Girl (1957)
 The Crammer (1958)
 Here I Am, Here I Stay (1959)
 What a Woman Dreams of in Springtime (1959)
 Yes, Women are Dangerous (1960)
  (1960)
 Her Most Beautiful Day (1962, based on the play Das Fenster zum Flur)
 My Daughter and I (1963)
  (1966)
 The Wedding Trip (1969)
  (1982, TV film)
 Ich heirate eine Familie (1983–1986, TV series)

External links

1920 births
2011 deaths
German male dramatists and playwrights
20th-century German dramatists and playwrights
German screenwriters
German male screenwriters
German television writers
20th-century German male writers
Officers Crosses of the Order of Merit of the Federal Republic of Germany
Rundfunk im amerikanischen Sektor people
Mass media people from Berlin